The AV-VB4 RE 4×4 GUARÁ is a Brazilian armoured personnel carrier that is currently being tested in Haiti. It holds a crew of four to six, and weighs 7.65 tonnes.

GUARÁ was developed from the chassis of the German off road vehicle UNIMOG 4000, whose platform met some important requirements, such as the ability of high-speed roads (97 km/h) and to go over various terrains, to be transported by rotary- and fixed-wing aircraft, maintaining a radius of 600 km, easy maintenance and good logistic dependence, low ground pressure, great tactical mobility and the option to be equipped with additional armor, a spacious interior and yet to have a relatively light weight of 7650 kg in standard configuration.

Several versions are planned, of which the most significant are: Command Post, anti-tank equipped with missiles and radar, forward reconnaissance, mortar carrier, Ambulance, etc..

History
On April 16, 2002, the IPD (Institute for Research and Development Army) introduced the Brazilian designed prototype of the newest Light Armored Reconnaissance 4x4 Car, designated AV-VB4 RE and christened GUARÁ—a species of wolf inhabiting different regions of Brazil.
Its official presentation took place from 22 to 25 April 2003 in the LAD, held in Rio de Janeiro, where it was possible to appreciate this vehicle on static display.

The project aims to meet the new family of wheeled armored vehicle to equip the Brazilian Army, who will attend a future selection for armored vehicles categories in 4×4 and 6×6 or 8×8 still no date set to begin, shows the capacity of the Industry that through partnerships with research centers and product development can generate a viable, reliable and great national participation, created between a private company and a government research body without generating any cost to the latter, common in the recent past, but little understood and disseminated.

At first glance the car impresses with its size, although there are smaller vehicles in the world and largest in this category, making it the youngest brother of other armored vehicles developed by Avibrás such as VBL, already exported to the Malaysian Army and in full serial production.

Description
The prototype presented featured welded mono-bloc body armour steel plates imported from the United States, designed to withstand fire from rotary MAG 7.62 mm machine guns and 12.7 mm (.50) calibre bullets.

Its engine is a Mercedes Benz OM 904 LA 4 177 hp turbo diesel. It is also equipped with 24 Volts DC electrical system, disc brakes on all four wheels with ABS/ALB, hydraulic power steering and electronically controlled transmission.
The suspension is progressive coil springs with shock absorbers, stabilizer bars and chassis frame of flexible, high torsional flexibility, 11:00-20SDC wheels and 335/80R20 radial tires, ready for any terrain.

Have as standard equipment: air conditioning system, thermal and acoustic insulation, heating and defogging; renewal system with air filtration, security lock starter; autopilot; toroid for driving with flat tire, gun hatch, antenna installation, directional lamp for reading maps; loophole / viewers, adjustable seats with three-point retractable seat belts, tool kit with flashlight, first-aid kit, hydraulic jack, two 20 liter canisters, rope winch, auxiliary air outlet, a fire extinguisher with external triggering; inclinometer; smoke grenade launcher, storage for machine gun ammunition and manuals.

As optional equipment may have: winch with a capacity of 7000 kg; smoke grenade launcher system, monitoring system control and tire pressure, additional shielding, additional anti-mine protection, internal anti-chipping lining; armored swiveling turret gun, driven electrically or mechanically, automatic fire detection and extinguishing; additional shielding for the windscreen, controlled from inside the cabin; CBN protection system, CBN contamination detection system, power mirrors, seats with integrated four-point safety belts, laser light detectors and infra-red night vision periscope for the shooter, driver and commander, laser range finder and targeting system, radio transmitter, intercom system, search light, camouflage transparent armor, parking brake on all four wheels, auxiliary power system, additional hatches, telescope mast for antennas with cameras (h = 7.6 m) GPS navigation system, steppe with crane, automatic transmission and low pressure tires.

Status
At the moment the vehicle is in testing at the Proving Ground Marambaia in Rio de Janeiro, being evaluated by the Army Technology Center. The next step will be the operational evaluation by the Center for reviews of the Army.

The Guara was developed through a partnership between the IPD/SCT (Institute for Research and Development/Department of Science and Technology) and Avibras, a survivor of the "golden period" of the production of military vehicles "Made in Brazil" between the 70s and early 90s. It is supposed to fill a gap that now exists in the Army in terms of armored 4x4 vehicles, and also to be exported to various countries, as has happened with other vehicles Avibrás series—e.g., to Malaysia.

References

Armoured personnel carriers of Brazil
Wheeled armoured personnel carriers
Armoured personnel carriers of the post–Cold War period